Parde Mein Rehne Do is a 2022 Pakistani social romantic comedy film written by Mohsin Ali, directed and produced by Wajahat Rauf under Showcase Productions. It stars Hania Aamir and Ali Rehman Khan. It was released on Eid al-Fitr, 3 May 2022, by Eveready Pictures and Geo Films. The film was a box-office failure.

Plot
The film revolves around a young married couple, Nazo and Shani, who are unable to have a child for years.

Cast
 Hania Aamir as Nazish "Nazo"
 Ali Rehman Khan as Kashaan Rana "Shani", Nazo's husband who has male infertility issue
 Jawed Sheikh as Latif Rana, Shani's father
 Munazzah Arif as Samreen, Shani's mother
 Muhammad Hasan Raza as Jedi
 Noor ul Hassan as Shafiq Rana
 Sadia Faisal as Laraib Rana "Lali"
 Shafqat Khan as Dabeer
 Sonia Nazir as Sonia, Nazo's colleague
 Saife Hassan as Nazo's father

Additionally, Dananeer Mobeen and Yasir Hussain was also appear.

Production
Wajahat Rauf announced on 1 March 2020 that he began the production of his new film, titled Parde Mein Rehne Do, with his wife Shazia Wajahat as an executive producer. While Hania Aamir already knew about Mohsin Ali's story, Rauf joined as director and producer afterwards and wanted a strong male character, so he cast Ali Rehman Khan. They had an intention to release the film that year, however after the half course of 18 days, the filming was paused on 19 March due to the COVID-19 pandemic in Pakistan. Later, after the lockdown restrictions lifted, the principal photography was resumed and wrapped-up on 22 February 2021 after the other 18 days, following the post-production phase.

Soundtrack

Release
Film teaser was released on 14 November 2021, and film trailer was launched with the soundtrack on 26 February 2022 in an event in Karachi. The film was released on Eid al-Fitr, 3 May 2022, under PG13 rating. It had a world television premiere on Eid al-Adha, 10 July 2022, on Har Pal Geo.

Home media

The film started digitally streaming on Tamasha from 10 July 2022.

References

External links

2020s Urdu-language films
2022 romantic comedy films
Pakistani romantic comedy films
Films postponed due to the COVID-19 pandemic
Films impacted by the COVID-19 pandemic
Films about social issues
Films about marriage